In politics, a purity test is a rigid standard on a specific issue by which a politician or other figure compared. Purity tests are established to ensure that the subject maintains ideological purity with the ideas supported by a particular group, often a political party or one specific faction of a party. Purity tests are often used in the form of strict in-group and out-group boundaries, where failure of purity tests indicates membership of an out-group. When used in this fashion, purity tests are a form of no true Scotsman fallacy. Purity tests are similar to the concept of litmus tests that are used in political nominations and appointments.

Usage

United Kingdom 
In the 2020s, members of the Labour Party were criticized for applying purity tests to their membership, and it has been attributed by some commentators as a reason for the party's electoral failure in the preceding years. Similar criticisms have also been made toward the Conservative Party in relation to issues such as Brexit.

United States 
In American politics, Republicans that are perceived as failing purity tests are referred to as Republicans in Name Only (RINOs). Likewise, such Democrats are referred to as Democrats in Name Only (DINOs).

In 2009, some members of the Republican Party advocated a list of ten requirements that candidates would have to meet in order to receive financial support from the party. This list was described by critics as a purity test. Purity tests became more prominent in the Republican Party during and after the Trump administration, where support for Donald Trump and his attempts to overturn the election has been described as the party's main purity test. Some Republican politicians, including Liz Cheney and Adam Kinzinger, were censured by their party for disagreement with Trump's false claims of election fraud. Measures to fight the COVID-19 pandemic met a similar response in the Republican Party, where opposition to certain measures had been described as a purity test.

In 2016, purity tests became an issue in the Democratic Party, especially in regard to issues such as abortion and health policy. This pattern continued during the 2020 Democratic Party presidential primaries, during which candidates and other major figures expressed concerns that purity tests were a cause for concern among the party. Former president Barack Obama broke his silence over the primary elections to warn Democrats about the danger of purity tests, saying that "we will not win just by increasing the turnout of the people who already agree with us completely on everything". In 2022, then-Democratic Senator Kyrsten Sinema was censured for disagreement with the party on filibuster reform, with some commentators describing this as an instance of purity testing.

Anti-Zionism and support for the Boycott, Divestment and Sanctions movement has been described as a purity test for left-wing movements in the United States.

See also 

 Cleavage (politics)
 Culture war
 Partisan (politics)
 Wedge issue
 Whip (politics)

References 

Political terminology of the United States